The Original Six are the six teams (Boston Bruins, Chicago Black Hawks, Detroit Red Wings, Montreal Canadiens, New York Rangers, and  Toronto Maple Leafs) that composed the National Hockey League (NHL) for the 25 seasons between the 1942–43 season and the 1967 NHL Expansion. The name is something of a misnomer, since there were other NHL franchises that ceased operations before 1942, including some that were founded before some of the Original Six. The term dates from the 1967 expansion which added six new franchises; hence the six expansion teams and the "Original Six".

Canadian television coverage
In the 1952–53 season, CBC began televising Hockey Night in Canada as a simulcast to the radio calls, joining the games in progress either 30 minutes or 60 minutes after the opening faceoff. Until 1961, the CBC was the only operating television network in Canada. Not only that, it was likely that not all Toronto Maple Leafs and Montreal Canadiens playoff games were televised in the early years, including to their local markets.

Notes
1955 - Game 3 of the Detroit-Toronto series and Game 5 of the Boston-Montreal series were televised nationally.
1956 - Game 4 of the Montreal-New York Rangers series was not the potential clincher, nor was it played in Montreal. Therefore, there was a possible chance that the game wasn't going to be televised.
1957 - Games 1, 2, and 4 of the Montreal-New York Rangers series were likely not seen outside the Montreal region if not televised at all.
1958 - Games 1–3 of the Montreal-Detroit series were likely not seen outside Quebec.
1959 - CBC's telecast of Game 7 of Toronto-Boston series at Boston Garden joins just before the start of the second period. Bill and Foster Hewitt were simulcasting on Toronto's CKFH and CBC Radio, and one of them welcomes the television audience.
1960 - In the May 28 edition of the Winnipeg Free Press, a Canadian Press article mentioned the fact that the CBC fielded numerous angry calls from viewers upset that CBC continued to televise all three overtimes of Game 3 of the Toronto-Detroit series. Because of this, the angry viewers missed several previously scheduled shows as the overtime continued on. The CBC said that the policy of telecasting each Stanley Cup playoff game to its conclusion would be enforced.
1961 - Some semifinal games may not have been seen outside the Toronto or Montreal metro areas.
This may have been the first time that all playoff games were televised somewhere across Canada.
1962 - CBC's Winnipeg affiliate carried Game 3 of the Montreal-Chicago series at 8:30 p.m. Central time (9:30 p.m. Eastern time). Meanwhile, they aired The Ed Sullivan Show at 7 p.m. (8 p.m. Eastern), which included guest stars Wayne and Shuster. This was followed by Close-Up at 8 p.m. (9 p.m. Eastern), and then the hockey game in progress.
On April 3, CBC's affiliates in and near Toronto aired The Garry Moore Show at 8 p.m. followed by Game 4 of the Toronto-New York Rangers game in progress at 9 p.m.
1967 - Except Game 2 of the Toronto-Chicago series, all Stanley Cup playoff games on CBC were televised in color. The 1967 playoffs were the first time CBC televised NHL games in color.

American television coverage
There was no American network television coverage of the Stanley Cup playoffs until 1965–66 (which also marked the first telecasts of an NHL game in color), the second to last season of the Original Six era. The earliest known American television coverage of any kind occurred in 1956, when Games 3 and 5 of the Montreal-New York Rangers playoff series were televised in the New York area on WPIX 11 at 9 p.m. local time. Bud Palmer worked play-by-play for those games on WPIX while and Jack McCarthy hosted from the studio.

Notes
1967 - CBS was scheduled to televise the Game 2 of the New York Rangers-Montreal series. However, an AFTRA strike forced cancellation of the telecast.

References

External links
Stanley Cup Playoffs on CBC - Google Search
Hockey Night in Canada

CBC Sports
NHL on NBC
CBS Sports
National Hockey League on television
National Hockey League on the radio
Lists of National Hockey League broadcasters
 
 
 
 
 
Toronto Maple Leafs lists
Broadcasters, Original Six